Richard Little was an English professional footballer who played as a right back in the Scottish League for Motherwell, Hamilton Academical, Dunfermline Athletic, Cowdenbeath and Morton.

Personal life 
Little served as an able seaman in the Royal Navy during the First World War. He served on HMS Ferret, HMS Nepean, HMS Excellent and saw action at the Battle of Jutland. After retiring from football, Little became a greenskeeper at Bothwell Castle Golf Club.

Career statistics

Honours 
Hamilton Academical

 Lanarkshire Cup: 1919–20

References

1895 births
English footballers
English Football League players
Newcastle United F.C. players
Scottish Football League players
Year of death missing
Place of death missing
Motherwell F.C. players
People from Ryton, Tyne and Wear
Footballers from Tyne and Wear
Royal Navy personnel of World War I
Association football fullbacks
Jarrow F.C. players
Hamilton Academical F.C. players
Cowdenbeath F.C. players
Greenock Morton F.C. players
Dunfermline Athletic F.C. players
Glentoran F.C. players
NIFL Premiership players
Newry City F.C. players
Royal Navy sailors